Leionema dentatum, commonly known as toothed phebalium is a species of large shrub or small tree that is endemic to  New South Wales, Australia. It has variable leaves, slender branches and clusters of cream-yellow flowers in spring.

Description
The calyx lobes are a wide-triangular shape and fleshy.

Taxonomy and naming
Leionema dentatum was first formally described in 1998 by Paul G. Wilson and the description was published in Nuytsia. The specific epithet (dentatum) is a Latin word meaning "toothed".

Distribution and habitat
This species grows mostly from Gibraltar Range National Park to the Illawarra region in southern New South Wales on sandstone in dry sclerophyll forests.

References

External links

dentatum
Sapindales of Australia
Flora of New South Wales
Taxa named by Paul G. Wilson